HUQ may refer to:
 Huq, a surname
 Tsat language, spoken in China
 Hun Airport, in Libya